Sypna is a genus of moths in the family Erebidae. The genus was erected by Achille Guenée in 1852.

Species

 Sypna albilinea Walker, 1858
 Sypna anisomeris Prout, 1926
 Sypna bella Bethune-Baker, 1906
 Sypna buruensis Prout, 1926
 Sypna coelisparsa Walker, 1858
 Sypna diversa Wileman & South, 1917
 Sypna dubitaria (Walker, 1865)
 Sypna martina (Felder & Rogenhofer, 1874)
 Sypna omicronigera Guenée, 1852
 Sypna rholatinum Prout, 1926
 Sypna sobrina Leech, 1900
 Sypna subrotunda Prout, 1926
 Sypna subsignata Walker, 1858

References

Sypnini
Moth genera